Wichí Lhamtés Vejoz is a Mataco-Guaicuru language of Argentina and Bolivia. Speakers are concentrated in northern parts of Chaco, Formosa, Salta, Jujuy Provinces, as well as west of Toba, the upper Bermejo River valley, and Pilcomayo River. The language is also called Mataco Vejoz and Vejos.

The Wichí languages are predominantly suffixing and polysynthetic; verbal words have between 2 and 15 morphemes. Alienable and inalienable possession is distinguished. The phonological inventory is large, with simple, glottalized  and aspirated stops and sonorants. The number of vowels varies with the language (five or six).

Phonology 

 // is heard as  after palatal consonants.
 // is heard as  when preceding uvular consonants.
 /, / sounds can be heard as  before uvular consonants.

See also
Wichí Lhamtés Nocten
Wichí Lhamtés Güisnay

Notes

External links
 Thathamet: Thatathyaj Thaye Thatenek (1926) Portions of the Book of Common Prayer and Paraphrases of Well-known English Hymns in the Mataco Language as Spoken by a Tribe of Indians Living in That Part of the Gran Chaco which is under the Rule of the Argentine Republic. Digitized by Richard Mammana
Collections in the Archive of the Indigenous Languages of Latin America

Matacoan languages
Languages of Bolivia
Languages of Argentina